The Philippine House Committee on Accounts, or House Accounts Committee is a standing committee of the Philippine House of Representatives.

Jurisdiction 
As prescribed by House Rules, the committee's jurisdiction is on the internal budget of the House which includes the following:
 Accounting
 Budget preparation
 Disbursements
 Financial operations
 Submission and approval

Members, 18th Congress

Historical members

18th Congress

Chairperson 
 Abraham Tolentino (Cavite–8th, NUP) July 24, 2019 – October 13, 2020

See also 
 House of Representatives of the Philippines
 List of Philippine House of Representatives committees

References

External links 
House of Representatives of the Philippines

Accounts